Sandusky is a city in the U.S. state of Michigan. The population was 2,679 at the 2010 census. It is the county seat of Sanilac County.

Geography
 It is considered to be part of the Thumb of Michigan, which in turn is a subregion of the Flint/Tri-Cities.
 Sandusky can also be considered as in the Blue Water Area, a subregion of the Thumb.

Transportation

Demographics

2010 census

As of the census of 2010, there were 2,679 people, 1,124 households, and 616 families living in the city. The racial makeup of the city was 94.4% White, 1.5% African American, 0.3% Native American, 1.1% Asian, 1.3% from other races, and 1.4% from two or more races. Hispanic or Latino of any race were 3.5% of the population.

There were 1,124 households, of which 28.5% had children under the age of 18 living with them, 36.1% were married couples living together, 15.1% had a female householder with no husband present, 3.6% had a male householder with no wife present, and 45.2% were non-families. 40.2% of all households were made up of individuals, and 17.5% had someone living alone who was 65 years of age or older. The average household size was 2.16 and the average family size was 2.85.

The median age in the city was 41.4 years. 21.3% of residents were under the age of 18; 9.4% were between the ages of 18 and 24; 23.5% were from 25 to 44; 27.7% were from 45 to 64; and 18.1% were 65 years of age or older. The gender makeup of the city was 45.7% male and 54.3% female.

2000 census
As of the census of 2000, there were 2,745 people, 1,081 households, and 649 families living in the city. The racial makeup of the city was 95.12% White, 0.87% African American, 0.15% Native American, 1.75% Asian, 1.35% from other races, and 0.77% from two or more races. Hispanic or Latino of any race were 3.42% of the population.

There were 1,081 households, out of which 31.2% had children under the age of 18 living with them, 43.6% were married couples living together, 13.0% had a female householder with no husband present, and 39.9% were non-families. 35.9% of all households were made up of individuals, and 16.7% had someone living alone who was 65 years of age or older. The average household size was 2.32 and the average family size was 2.97.

In the city, the population was spread out, with 22.8% under the age of 18, 9.3% from 18 to 24, 29.5% from 25 to 44, 19.6% from 45 to 64, and 18.8% who were 65 years of age or older. The median age was 38 years. For every 100 females, there were 86.5 males. For every 100 females age 18 and over, there were 85.8 males.

The median income for a household in the city was $33,667, and the median income for a family was $44,622. Males had a median income of $31,531 versus $20,932 for females. The per capita income for the city was $17,639. About 7.2% of families and 11.0% of the population were below the poverty line, including 8.9% of those under age 18 and 14.0% of those age 65 or over.

Media

Radio

Local radio stations licensed to serve Sandusky are commercial broadcasters WMIC AM and WTGV FM, owned by Sanilac/GB Broadcasting; and religious station WNFR.

FM
 WHYT 88.1 FM, Imlay City, Contemporary Christian, Smile FM
 WNFR 90.7 FM, Sandusky, Contemporary Christian 90.7 Hope FM
 WIDL 92.1 FM, Cass City, Classic Rock I-92, The Thumb's Only Road for Pure Classic Rock 
 WBGV 92.5 FM, Marlette, Country, The Thumb's Best Country
 WHNN 96.1 FM, Bay City, Adult Contemporary, My 96-1, The Best Variety of Yesterday and Today
 WBTI 96.9 FM, Lexington, CHR/Top 40, Today's Hit Music
 WTGV 97.7 FM, Sandusky, Classic Hits, 97-7 WTGV, The Thumb's Greatest Hits
 WKCQ 98.1 FM, Saginaw, Country, 98 KCQ, The Most Country
 WLEW 102.1 FM, Bad Axe, Classic Hits, Cruise 102, The Station That Rocks the Docks and Shakes the Lakes
 WQUS 103.1 FM, Lapeer, Classic Rock, U.S. 103.1, Ultimate Classic Rock
 WCZE 103.7 FM, Harbor Beach, Christian Country, Positive Country 103.7 
 WSAQ 107.1 FM, Port Huron, Country, Q-Country, The Greatest Country Music of All Time

AM
 WMIC 660 AM, Sandusky (Daytime Only), Full Service/Country, The Thumb's Information Station
 WSGW 790 AM, Saginaw, News/Talk, Your Connection to the Saginaw Valley and the World
 CHOK 1070 AM, Sarnia, Full Service/AC, First in Local Information
 WMPC 1230 AM, Lapeer, Religious, Where Many Preach Christ
 WLEW 1340 AM, Bad Axe, Country, The Thumb's Hottest Country 
 WKYO 1360 AM, Caro, Classic Country, Classic Country WKYO
 WPHM 1380 AM, Port Huron, News/Talk/Sports, Where the Blue Water Area Comes to Talk
 WHLS 1450 AM, Port Huron, Active Rock, Rock 105.5, ,Port Huron's Alternative
 WLCO 1530 AM, Lapeer, Classic Country, Real Country, Today's Stars and Legends

Newspaper
 Sandusky and Sanilac County are served by The Sandusky Tribune, which hits news racks on Wednesdays and mailboxes on Thursdays.
 Daily editions of the Detroit Free Press, The Detroit News and the Port Huron Times Herald are also available throughout the area.

Climate
This climatic region is typified by large seasonal temperature differences, with warm to hot (and often humid) summers and cold (sometimes severely cold) winters.  According to the Köppen Climate Classification system, Sandusky has a humid continental climate, abbreviated "Dfb" on climate maps.

Government
Sandusky city is governed under the 4th Class City charter, original written in 1895 as the Fourth Class City Act then recognized as the cities' charter in 1976.

References

External links

 City of Sandusky

Cities in Sanilac County, Michigan
County seats in Michigan